The West Branch Narraguagus River is a short stream in Township 34, MD, Hancock County, Maine. 

See also
 List of rivers of Maine

References

Maine Streamflow Data from the USGS
Maine Watershed Data From Environmental Protection Agency

Rivers of Maine
Rivers of Hancock County, Maine